The 2015 Big Ten Men's Lacrosse Tournament took place April 30 to May 2 at Capital One Field at Byrd Stadium in  College Park, Maryland. The winner of the tournament received the Big Ten Conference's automatic bid to the 2015 NCAA Division I Men's Lacrosse Championship. Four teams competed in the inaugural Big Ten Conference Men's Lacrosse Tournament in a single elimination format. The seeds were based upon the teams' regular season conference record. Johns Hopkins won the tournament, beating Ohio State 13-6.

Standings
Only the top four teams in the Big Ten Conference advanced to the Big Ten Conference Tournament.

Not including Big Ten Tournament and NCAA tournament results

Schedule

Bracket
Capital One Field at Byrd Stadium – College Park, Maryland

Awards

 MVP: Wells Stanwick, Johns Hopkins
 All-Tournament Team
 Wells Stanwick, Johns Hopkins
 Eric Schneider, Johns Hopkins
 Michael Pellegrino, Johns Hopkins
 Holden Cattoni, Johns Hopkins
 Jesse King, Ohio State
 David Planning, Ohio State
 Robby Haus, Ohio State
 Connor Darcey, Penn State
 Matt Florence, Penn State
 Bryan Cole, Maryland

References

External links  
 2015 Big Ten Men's Lacrosse Tournament Central

Big Ten Tournament
Big Ten Conference Men's Lacrosse
Lacrosse in Maryland
Big Ten men's lacrosse tournament